The 1998 Texas A&M Aggies football team completed the season with an 11–3 record.  The Aggies had a regular season Big 12 Conference record of 7–1, followed by an upset win against Kansas State in the 1998 Big 12 title game.  Because of this, the team was invited to the Sugar Bowl, where they lost to Ohio State 24-14.

Schedule

  Win forfeited due to ineligible player.

Rankings

Roster

Game summaries

Florida State

Louisiana Tech

Texas A&M's 28–7 win over Louisiana Tech was forfeited on September 23 after Aggie running back D'Andre Hardeman was discovered to have been academically ineligible. Since Hardeman had played in the first two games of the 1998 season, he was disqualified from playing for the remainder of the year.

Southern Miss

North Texas

Kansas

Dante Hall rushes for 177 yards.

Nebraska

This game began the Aggies' annual Maroon Out tradition. A&M scored a dramatic upset at home over undefeated Nebraska.  Two 100-yard rushers for the Aggies in Dante Hall(113) and Ja’mar Toombs(110).

Baylor

Texas Tech

Oklahoma State

Oklahoma

Missouri

Texas

Kansas State

Ohio State

References

Texas AandM
Texas A&M Aggies football seasons
Big 12 Conference football champion seasons
Texas AandM Aggies football